Aeromicrobium fastidiosum is a bacterium from the genus Aeromicrobium.

References 

Propionibacteriales
Bacteria described in 1989